This is the electoral history of Kyrsten Sinema, the senior United States senator from Arizona since 2019. Previously, she represented the 15th district in the Arizona House of Representatives from 2005 to 2011 and in the Arizona Senate from 2011 to 2012. From 2013 to 2019, Sinema represented the newly created 9th congressional district in the United States House of Representatives. Sinema became the first openly bisexual person elected to the House of Representatives in 2012 and to the United States Senate in 2018. She is also the first woman elected to the U.S. Senate from Arizona.

Phoenix City Council

2001

Arizona House of Representatives

2002

2004

2006

2008

Arizona Senate

2010

U.S. House of Representatives

2012

2014

2016

U.S. Senate

2018

References

Notes 

Sinema, Kyrsten